Joel Enarsson (born 28 June 1993) is a Swedish footballer who plays as a forward for FK Karlskrona.

References

External links

1993 births
Living people
Association football forwards
IFK Norrköping players
GIF Sundsvall players
Mjällby AIF players
Swedish footballers
Allsvenskan players